Pierre-Eugène Rouanet, S.M.A. (16 November 1917 – 4 February 2012) was a French bishop of the Roman Catholic Church.

Rouanet was born in  Mazamet, France and ordained a priest in the society of apostolic life, the Society of African Missions on 4 July 1948. He was appointed bishop of the Diocese of Daloa on 4 July 1956 and ordained bishop on 29 November 1956. He resigned from governance of the see on 20 November 1975.

External links
Catholic Hierarchy

1917 births
2012 deaths
People from Mazamet
French Roman Catholic bishops in Africa
20th-century Roman Catholic bishops in Ivory Coast
Participants in the Second Vatican Council
French Roman Catholic missionaries
Roman Catholic missionaries in Ivory Coast
French expatriates in Ivory Coast
Roman Catholic bishops of Daloa